The Liverpool Leopards were a British ice hockey club, from Liverpool, England. They were formed in 1948 and played their home games at the Palace Ice Rink, Liverpool. The team competed in several leagues during their existence. The club folded at the end of the 1981/82 season.

History

Midland League Years...
The Midland Intermediate League was formed in the 1951/2 season and lasted for four years, with the Merseyside outfit competing in a four team competition with Grimsby Redwings, Blackpool Seagulls and the Nottingham Wolves. The Leopards won the inaugural title, which alongside their exploits in the C.W. Jones Cup and also winning the Blackpool Icedrome Trophy completed a magnificent "treble" in the 51/52 season, without doubt the city's most successful period in hockey.

Southern League
1973 saw a return of Ice Hockey in Liverpool with the Leopards reborn. The club took a place in the top flight of the English game, the Southern League but finished 6th in the seven team competition and propped up the league the following season.

1975 saw a dramatic improvement, however. The Leopards finished second and were only pipped to the title by local neighbours and experienced side Altrincham. A 3rd-placed finish in 1976 continued an impressive couple of years before a 5th place in the Southern League's final season.

English League North
1978 saw a major restructure of Ice Hockey in the UK. The end of the Southern League saw the formation of the English League. Playing in the Northern division, Leopards finished second from bottom in the League's opening year.

Under the guidance of chief coach Bill Wilson and Swedish player coach Åke Alm, who had arrived from national champions Murrayfield Racers, Liverpool strolled to the 79/80 League title. The Merseyside team won all 8 games, and became the first team to go the entire season undefeated in the league after beating Sheffield Knights 19–0. In the Icy Smith Cup (National Championship), Liverpool failed to reach the national final after they were knocked out by Blackpool losing 3–2 in the regional final.

Charlie Birch, with a 91% save percentage over the season was named the League's Netminder of the Year and placed in the League's dream team alongside Bernie Butler, Frank Davies and Alan Mortimer. Alm was named Coach of the Year.

80/81 saw Liverpool finish second to old foes Blackpool. Bernie Butler was once again a stand out player as he finished 3rd in the League's top scorers.

Liverpool's final season saw them complete the season in fifth place, with Butler once again making the league's dream team.

1982/83 saw another major restructure of the British game. The end of the English League saw the creation of the British Hockey League. Sponsored by Heineken, this saw the end of the regional leagues and the beginning of new national league structures, and even a TV deal with the BBC. Unfortunately the Leopards didn't get to take part in the new league structure, as they were disbanded in the summer before its inception.

Liverpool Tournament 

The Leopards hosted an annual invitational tournament from 1949 to 1956. In its five-year existence, the home side managed to win the "C.W. Jones Cup" twice (1951/2 & 1954/5). The club also finished runners up on two occasions.

Honours 

Midland Intermediate League
 1951–52

English League North
 1979-80

Liverpool Tournament
 1952, 1955

Blackpool Icedrome Trophy
 1952

References 

Ice hockey teams in England
Sport in Liverpool
Ice hockey clubs established in 1948
Ice hockey clubs disestablished in 1982
1948 establishments in England
1982 disestablishments in England